The Americas Zone is one of three zones of regional competition in the 2020–21 Billie Jean King Cup.

Group I 
 Venue: Club Palestino, Santiago, Chile (clay)
 Date: 5–8 February 2020

The seven teams were divided into two pools of three and four teams. The two pool winners took part in a play-off to determine the nation advancing to the play-offs. The nations finishing last (in Pool A) and second last (in Pool B) took part in a relegation play-off, with the losing nation relegated to Group II for 2022. The nation finishing last in Pool B was automatically relegated to Group II for 2022.

Seeding

 1Billie Jean King Cup Rankings as of 11 November 2019

Pools

Play-offs

Final placements 

Group II 
 Venue 1: Centro de Alto Rendimiento Fred Maduro, Panama City, Panama (clay) 
 Venue 2: Club de Tenis La Paz, La Paz, Bolivia (clay)
 Dates: 23–26 June 2021 (Panama City) and 27–30 October 2021 (La Paz)

The fourteen teams will compete across two different venues, with 7 nations taking part in La Paz, and 7 nations taking part in Panama City. In La Paz, the seven teams were divided into two pools of three and four teams. The winners of each pool will play-off to determine the nation advancing to Group I in 2022. In Panama City, the seven teams were divided into two pools of four and three teams, with the winning nation promoted to Group I in 2022.

Seeding

Panama City

 1Billie Jean King Cup Rankings as of 19 April 2021

La Paz

 1Billie Jean King Cup Rankings as of 19 April 2021

Pools

Play-offs

Final placements 

References 

 Billie Jean King Cup Result, 2020 Americas Group I
 Billie Jean King Cup Result, 2020 Americas Group II

External links 
 Billie Jean King Cup website

 
Americas
Tennis tournaments in Chile
Tennis tournaments in Bolivia
Tennis tournaments in Panama
Billie Jean King Cup Americas Zone
Billie Jean King Cup Americas Zone
Billie Jean King Cup Americas Zone